Richard Liebscher (born 2 November 1910, date of death unknown) was a German fencer. He competed in the individual and team sabre events at the 1952 Summer Olympics.

References

1910 births
Year of death missing
German male fencers
Olympic fencers of West Germany
Fencers at the 1952 Summer Olympics